A three-CCD (3CCD) camera is a camera whose imaging system uses three separate charge-coupled devices (CCDs), each one receiving filtered red, green, or blue color ranges. Light coming in from the lens is split by a beam-splitter prism into three beams, which are then filtered to produce colored light in three color ranges or "bands". The system is employed by high quality still cameras, telecine systems, professional video cameras and some prosumer video cameras.

Compared to cameras with only one CCD, three-CCD cameras generally provide superior image quality by using full-frame dichroic filters to better separate the red, green and blue color bands, and better low-light performance. By separating red, green, and blue color ranges with a 1:1 pixel ratio (known as "4:4:4"), three-CCD cameras achieve much better precision than single-CCD cameras.

In contrast, almost all single-CCD cameras use a Bayer filter, using less accurate dye filters in front of each pixel to separate the colors. Because each pixel on a single CCD sensor is covered with its own tiny color filter, a frame is necessary to keep the dye filters from leaking into adjacent pixels. The result is less light absorbed compared to a CCD without a Bayer filter. Typically there is a 2:1 ratio of green and red/blue pixels, producing less color detail.

Image gallery

See also
 
 Thin-film optics

References

External links
 Prism-Based Color Separation for Professional Digital Photography

Digital photography
Image sensors